Sins Without Intentions is a 1975 Italian erotic-drama film written and directed by Theo Campanelli and starring Jenny Tamburi, Gabriele Tinti and Luigi Pistilli.

Plot 
When she reaches adulthood, Stefania leaves the orphanage at Ascoli Piceno where she was raised and goes to live with her stepfather. He is a humble fisherman who lives in a shack near the sea. He abuses her and she runs away. Stefania ends up living in the home of Laura, one of the teachers at the college. A relationship develops between Stefania and Laura. Later, Stephanie attends a painting school and falls in love with her teacher, Maurizio. Laura, now obsessed with Stefania, ends her own life.

Cast 
Jenny Tamburi as Stefania 
Gabriele Tinti as Maurizio
Luigi Pistilli as Stefania's Stepfather 
 Francesca Romana Coluzzi as Paola
 Cristiano Auer as Director of 'Anatema'

References

External links

Sins Without Intentions at Variety Distribution

Italian erotic drama films
1970s erotic drama films
1975 directorial debut films
Films scored by Stelvio Cipriani
1975 drama films
1975 films
1970s Italian films
1970s Italian-language films